York University GO Station was a train station on GO Transit's Barrie line, in the North York district of Toronto, Ontario, Canada. The station was only served on weekdays, southbound during the morning peak period and northbound during the afternoon peak period; its replacement, the nearby Downsview Park station, provides a connection from midday, evening, weekend, and holiday GO trains to the university at all times via a two-stop trip on the Toronto Transit Commission's (TTC) Line 1 subway. The station was permanently closed on July 19, 2021. It was demolished in April 2022, with only a concrete ledge and some signage remaining.

History
York University GO Station was funded by a provincial investment of $850,000 and completed in 2002. The station officially opened on September 6, 2002, though it had been put into service earlier. The station consisted of a single platform on the west track with passenger shelters and a ticket vending machine.

Downsview Park station was originally planned to entirely replace York University GO station, given that it would be connected to York University by the new namesake interchange station on the TTC's Line 1 subway extension.  However, following objection from York University members and a local councillor, the station was not closed following the inauguration of GO train service at Downsview Park on December 30, 2017. As a compromise, service was retained at York University in one direction during the weekday peak periods, but off-peak services would no longer stop at York University GO station.

On March 18, 2020, the station was temporarily closed due to the impact of the COVID-19 pandemic and the resulting closure of most campus operations at York University. As of October 2020, the station was no longer listed on schedules or on GO Transit's website, though it had not been officially closed. As of February 12, 2021, York University GO Station was no longer shown on GO Transit's system map. On July 19, 2021, Metrolinx announced that the station had been permanently closed. Metrolinx was in the process of expanding the Barrie line for all-day, two-way service, and it needed to demolish the station in order to lay extra track.

Services
From January 2018 to March 2020, weekday service consisted of 8 trains southbound to Union Station in the morning, 7 trains northbound to Barrie Allandale Station in the afternoon, and 1 train northbound to Bradford GO Station in the evening. From the opening of Downsview Park station in late December 2017, the station had not had any service on weekends.

The services utilized a mixed fleet of buses, from transit buses to van based shuttle buses. These buses ran from Keele campuses to off campus housing and the GO station.

The station had no connecting public transit services. The only bus route that directly served the station was York University's privately operated shuttle bus, which was only available to York University students and employees. For non-shuttle access passengers had a narrow walkway between two industrial buildings to reach the platform area.

References

External links

2002 establishments in Ontario
2021 disestablishments in Ontario
GO Transit railway stations
Railway stations in Toronto
Railway stations in Canada opened in 2002
Railway stations closed in 2021
North York
York University